Om Prakash Sharma  is a former Governor of Nagaland.

Prior to being Governor of Nagaland, he served with the Indian Police Service and was Director general of police in Punjab, India.

References

Indian police officers
Governors of Nagaland
Living people
Year of birth missing (living people)